The 72nd running of the Tour of Flanders cycling classic was held on 3 April 1988. It was won by Eddy Planckaert in a two-man sprint with Australian Phil Anderson. 88 of 197 starters finished the race.

Race report
On the Berendries, 30 km from the finish, Marc Sergeant, Rudy Dhaenens and Phil Anderson broke clear, but Sean Kelly made his team work in pursuit. At the top of the Muur van Geraardsbergen, three riders, Adrie van der Poel, Eddy Planckaert and Phil Anderson, were ahead of the peloton. Van der Poel was dropped on the Bosberg and Anderson made several frantic efforts to distance the fast Planckaert on the final run-in towards Meerbeke. Planckaert, relying on his strong sprint finish, easily beat Anderson at the line. Van der Poel won the sprint for third place, 18 seconds behind Planckaert. Eddy Planckaert won his first monument classic, 12 years after his brother Walter Planckaert won the Tour of Flanders.

Route
The race started in Sint-Niklaas and finished in Meerbeke (Ninove) – totaling 279 km.
The course featured 12 categorized climbs:

Results

External links
Video of the 1988 Tour of Flanders  on Sporza (in Dutch)

References

Tour of Flanders
Tour of Flanders
Tour of Flanders